The Heart Is a Lonely Hunter is a 1940 novel by Carson McCullers.

The Heart Is a Lonely Hunter may also refer to:

 The Heart Is a Lonely Hunter (film), a 1968 adaptation of McCullers's novel
 "The Heart Is a Lonely Hunter" (Once Upon a Time), a television episode
 "The Heart Is a Lonely Hunter" (song), by Reba McEntire, 1994
 "The Heart Is a Lonely Hunter", a song by Delta 5, 1982
 "The Heart Is a Lonely Hunter", a song by The Anniversary from Designing a Nervous Breakdown, 2000
 "The Heart's a Lonely Hunter", a song by Thievery Corporation from The Cosmic Game, 2005